Arnon Soffer (born 24 December 1935) is an Israeli geographer and a professor of Geography and environmental sciences, specialising  in water issues and demography. Soffer is one of the founders of the University of Haifa. He is known for his research into demographic, water, environmental, political, and strategy issues of the state of Israel.

Soffer has been vocal about geographical processes that endanger the existence of the State of Israel, and was one of the first to describe the increase in population of Palestinians as a "demographic threat" to the State of Israel.

Biography 
Soffer was born in Tel Aviv and grew up in Rishon LeZion, which was originally a moshava and became a city when he turned 15 (in 1950). He and his classmates from the Gymnasia Realit formed the first handball team of the city, which operated under the auspices of "Maccabi". In the 1950s Soffer played in Israel's handball national team. During his military service in the IDF, he served in the Nahal Brigade.

Soffer has three academic degrees from the Hebrew University of Jerusalem. In 1965, he was granted a position as a lecturer at the University of Haifa. Soffer served in a variety of roles in the academic faculty at the University of Haifa, including the Department for Geography, chairman of the Jewish-Arab Center and the Institute for the Study of the Middle East, Dean of the Faculty for Social Sciences and Vice Chairman of the Center for National security research. Since 1970, he has taught, mentored and is involved in the IDF Command and Staff College; In  1978 he became a professor at the National Defense College and was appointed head of the College Research Center in 2007.

Soffer is now retired, and teaches only the security officials studying at the University of Haifa, including students from the National Defense College, Tactical Command College, the Havatzalot Program of the Intelligence Corps, and the Trainee Course of the Israel police. He is married with four children and eight grandchildren.

Criticism 
His alleged obsession with the demographic threat posed by the increase of the Arab population led to some of his colleagues at the University of Haifa nicknaming him "Arnon the Arab-counter", a joking reference to the fact that the Hebrew surname Soffer literally means "one who counts". As such he has been credited with working to implement the "separation policy" of Israel. This has been labeled by some Israel critics as modeling apartheid.

References

External links 
 Some of Soffer's article - at the Haifa University website (Hebrew)
 Prof. Arnon Soffer's CV (Hebrew)
 Prof. Arnon Soffer column in the Ynet "opinions" section (Hebrew)
 More pullouts needed to preserve Jewish country, published in ynetnews.com on 1/24/2006 (English)
 Prof. Arnon Soffer video lecture - Climate refugees, on the academic channel, 1/10/2009 (Hebrew)
 Prof. Arnon Soffer video lecture - The water struggles in the Middle East, on the academic channel, 01/12/2010 (Hebrew)
Prof. Arnon Soffer Collection on the Digital collections of Younes and Soraya Nazarian Library, University of Haifa

Academic staff of the University of Haifa
Israeli geographers
Living people
1935 births
Hebrew University of Jerusalem alumni